The 2006–07 Cleveland Cavaliers season was the 37th season of NBA basketball in Cleveland, Ohio. Led by 22-year old forward LeBron James, the Cavaliers finished the season with a 50–32 record, finishing second-place in the Central Division, winning their first Eastern Conference championship, and earning the franchise's first trip to the NBA Finals. During the season, the Cavaliers had the fourth best team defensive rating in the NBA.

Prior to making their first NBA Finals appearance, in the playoffs, the Cavaliers swept the Washington Wizards in four games in the First Round, defeated the New Jersey Nets in six games in the semifinals, and defeated the Detroit Pistons in six games in the Conference Finals.

However, in the NBA Finals, the Cavaliers would collapse, as they were swept by the more experienced San Antonio Spurs in four games. LeBron James was the team's leading scorer and finished in 5th place in league MVP voting.

The Cavaliers would not make it back to the Finals until 2015, when James returned to the team after a four year tenure with the Miami Heat.

Key Dates
 On June 28, the 2006 NBA draft took place in New York City.
 In July, the free agency period began.
 On October 10, the Cavaliers' preseason began with a 93–109 loss to the Boston Celtics.
 On November 1, the Cavaliers' regular season began with a 97–94 win over the Washington Wizards.
 On March 27, the Cavaliers clinched a playoff berth.
 On June 2, the Cavaliers won their first ever Eastern Conference championship.
 On June 14, the Cavaliers' season ended in an NBA Finals sweep to the San Antonio Spurs.

Offseason

Free agents

Trades

Draft picks

*2nd round pick acquired from Philadelphia in Lee Nailon deal.

Roster

Player salaries

Regular season

Season standings

Record vs. opponents

|- bgcolor="#ccffcc"
| 1
| November 1
| Washington
| 
| Larry Hughes (27)
| Drew Gooden (11)
| LeBron James, Larry Hughes (5)
| Quicken Loans Arena20,562
| 1–0
|- bgcolor="#ccffcc"
| 2
| November 3
| @ San Antonio
| 
| LeBron James (35)
| Zydrunas Ilgauskas (11)
| Eric Snow (6)
| AT&T Center18,797
| 2–0
|- bgcolor="#ffcccc"
| 3
| November 4
| @ Charlotte
| 
| Drew Gooden (21)
| Drew Gooden (16)
| LeBron James (7)
| Charlotte Bobcats Arena19,147
| 2–1
|- bgcolor="#ffcccc"
| 4
| November 7
| Atlanta
| 
| LeBron James (34)
| Drew Gooden (14)
| LeBron James, Eric Snow (6)
| Quicken Loans Arena20,562
| 2–2
|- bgcolor="#ccffcc"
| 5
| November 9
| Chicago
| 
| Drew Gooden (20)
| Drew Gooden, Zydrunas Ilgauskas (9)
| LeBron James (12)
| Quicken Loans Arena19,947
| 3–2
|- bgcolor="#ccffcc"
| 6
| November 11
| Boston
| 
| LeBron James (38)
| Anderson Varejão (10)
| LeBron James (5)
| Quicken Loans Arena20,562
| 4–2
|- bgcolor="#ccffcc"
| 7
| November 13
| @ New York
| 
| LeBron James, Damon Jones (29)
| Drew Gooden (11)
| LeBron James (6)
| Madison Square Garden18,468
| 5–2
|- bgcolor="#ccffcc"
| 8
| November 15
| Portland
| 
| LeBron James (32)
| Donyell Marshall (8)
| LeBron James (7)
| Quicken Loans Arena20,096
| 6–2
|- bgcolor="#ccffcc"
| 9
| November 17
| Minnesota
| 
| LeBron James (37)
| LeBron James, Drew Gooden (9)
| LeBron James (6)
| Quicken Loans Arena20,562
| 7–2
|- bgcolor="#ffcccc"
| 10
| November 18
| @ Washington
| 
| LeBron James (20)
| Drew Gooden (7)
| Eric Snow (8)
| Verizon Center20,173
| 7–3
|- bgcolor="#ccffcc"
| 11
| November 21
| Memphis
| 
| Drew Gooden (22)
| Drew Gooden (15)
| LeBron James (9)
| Quicken Loans Arena20,562
| 8–3
|- bgcolor="#ffcccc"
| 12
| November 22
| @ Toronto
| 
| LeBron James (30)
| LeBron James, Anderson Varejão (10)
| LeBron James (8)
| Air Canada Centre19,800
| 8–4
|- bgcolor="#ffcccc"
| 13
| November 24
| @ Indiana
| 
| LeBron James (30)
| Drew Gooden (12)
| LeBron James (5)
| Conseco Fieldhouse18,165
| 8–5
|- bgcolor="#ccffcc"
| 14
| November 25
| Philadelphia
| 
| LeBron James (25)
| Zydrunas Ilgauskas (15)
| LeBron James (11)
| Quicken Loans Arena20,562
| 9–5
|- bgcolor="#ffcccc"
| 15
| November 29
| New York
| 
| LeBron James (27)
| Zydrunas Ilgauskas (12)
| Eric Snow (9)
| Quicken Loans Arena20,192
| 9–6

|- bgcolor="#ccffcc"
| 16
| December 1
| @ Atlanta
| 
| LeBron James (31)
| LeBron James, Drew Gooden, Zydrunas Ilgauskas, Donyell Marshall (7)
| LeBron James, Eric Snow (8)
| Philips Arena19,650
| 10–6
|- bgcolor="#ffcccc"
| 17
| December 2
| @ Houston
| 
| LeBron James (21)
| Anderson Varejão (9)
| LeBron James (4)
| Toyota Center18,260
| 10–7
|- bgcolor="#ccffcc"
| 18
| December 6
| Toronto
| 
| LeBron James (26)
| Anderson Varejão (11)
| LeBron James (10)
| Quicken Loans Arena20,119
| 11–7
|- bgcolor="#ccffcc"
| 19
| December 9
| Indiana
| 
| LeBron James (27)
| Donyell Marshall (17)
| LeBron James (6)
| Quicken Loans Arena20,562
| 12–7
|- bgcolor="#ffcccc"
| 20
| December 11
| @ New Orleans/Oklahoma City
| 
| Anderson Varejão (17)
| Zydrunas Ilgauskas (12)
| Eric Snow (7)
| Ford Center19,164
| 12–8
|- bgcolor="#ccffcc"
| 21
| December 13
| Charlotte
| 
| LeBron James (22)
| Anderson Varejão (10)
| LeBron James, Eric Snow (7)
| Quicken Loans Arena20,562
| 13–8
|- bgcolor="#ccffcc"
| 22
| December 15
| Seattle
| 
| Larry Hughes (25)
| Anderson Varejão (13)
| LeBron James (7)
| Quicken Loans Arena20,562
| 14–8
|- bgcolor="#ffcccc"
| 23
| December 16
| @ Orlando
| 
| LeBron James (29)
| Drew Gooden (12)
| LeBron James (5)
| Amway Arena17,451
| 14–9
|- bgcolor="#ffcccc"
| 24
| December 20
| @ New Jersey
| 
| LeBron James (37)
| Zydrunas Ilgauskas (11)
| LeBron James (8)
| Continental Airlines Arena17,270
| 14–10
|- bgcolor="#ffcccc"
| 25
| December 21
| Detroit
| 
| LeBron James (26)
| LeBron James (10)
| LeBron James (5)
| Quicken Loans Arena20,562
| 14–11
|- bgcolor="#ccffcc"
| 26
| December 23
| Orlando
| 
| LeBron James (32)
| Drew Gooden (12)
| Eric Snow, Damon Jones (4)
| Quicken Loans Arena20,562
| 15–11
|- bgcolor="#ccffcc"
| 27
| December 27
| @ Atlanta
| 
| LeBron James (27)
| Zydrunas Ilgauskas (10)
| Larry Hughes (4)
| Philips Arena19,467
| 16–11
|- bgcolor="#ccffcc"
| 28
| December 29
| Milwaukee
| 
| LeBron James (32)
| Donyell Marshall, Drew Gooden (10)
| Eric Snow (10)
| Quicken Loans Arena20,562
| 17–11
|- bgcolor="#ffcccc"
| 29
| December 30
| @ Chicago
| 
| LeBron James (33)
| Drew Gooden (12)
| LeBron James, Donyell Marshall, Daniel Gibson, Eric Snow (3)
| United Center22,965
| 17–12

|- bgcolor="#ccffcc"
| 30
| January 2
| San Antonio
| 
| LeBron James (19)
| Zydrunas Ilgauskas (13)
| LeBron James, Larry Hughes (5)
| Quicken Loans Arena20,214
| 18–12
|- bgcolor="#ccffcc"
| 31
| January 3
| @ Boston
| 
| LeBron James (32)
| Drew Gooden (12)
| Eric Snow (6)
| TD Banknorth Garden18,624
| 19–12
|- bgcolor="#ccffcc"
| 32
| January 5
| @ Milwaukee
| 
| Drew Gooden (31)
| Drew Gooden (16)
| LeBron James (9)
| Bradley Center18,717
| 20–12
|- bgcolor="#ccffcc"
| 33
| January 6
| New Jersey
| 
| Larry Hughes, Drew Gooden (21)
| LeBron James (13)
| Eric Snow (7)
| Quicken Loans Arena20,562
| 21–12
|- bgcolor="#ccffcc"
| 34
| January 9
| @ Sacramento
| 
| LeBron James (34)
| Drew Gooden (11)
| LeBron James (7)
| ARCO Arena17,317
| 22–12
|- bgcolor="#ffcccc"
| 35
| January 11
| @ Phoenix
| 
| LeBron James (34)
| Zydrunas Ilgauskas (9)
| LeBron James (6)
| US Airways Center18,422
| 22–13
|- bgcolor="#ccffcc"
| 36
| January 13
| @ L. A. Clippers
| 
| LeBron James (28)
| Anderson Varejão (12)
| LeBron James (6)
| STAPLES Center20,027
| 23–13
|- bgcolor="#ffcccc"
| 37
| January 16
| @ Seattle
| 
| LeBron James (30)
| Zydrunas Ilgauskas (11)
| LeBron James (8)
| KeyArena15,619
| 23–14
|- bgcolor="#ffcccc"
| 38
| January 17
| @ Portland
| 
| LeBron James (23)
| Anderson Varejão (11)
| Daniel Gibson (3)
| Rose Garden Arena19,228
| 23–15
|- bgcolor="#ffcccc"
| 39
| January 19
| @ Denver
| 
| LeBron James (30)
| LeBron James (10)
| LeBron James (10)
| Pepsi Center19,155
| 23–16
|- bgcolor="#ccffcc"
| 40
| January 20
| @ Golden State
| 
| LeBron James (32)
| Anderson Varejão (12)
| Eric Snow (11)
| Oracle Arena19,864
| 24–16
|- bgcolor="#ffcccc"
| 41
| January 22
| Orlando
| 
| LeBron James (18)
| Drew Gooden (11)
| Larry Hughes (7)
| Quicken Loans Arena20,562
| 24–17
|- bgcolor="#ffcccc"
| 42
| January 24
| Philadelphia
| 
| LeBron James (39)
| LeBron James, Zydrunas Ilgauskas, Anderson Varejão (10)
| LeBron James, Anderson Varejão, Eric Snow (5)
| Quicken Loans Arena20,562
| 24–18
|- bgcolor="#ccffcc"
| 43
| January 26
| @ Philadelphia
| 
| Drew Gooden (21)
| Drew Gooden (10)
| Daniel Gibson (5)
| Wachovia Center19,523
| 25–18
|- bgcolor="#ffcccc"
| 44
| January 28
| Phoenix
| 
| LeBron James (30)
| Drew Gooden (14)
| LeBron James, Daniel Gibson (5)
| Quicken Loans Arena20,562
| 25–19
|- bgcolor="#ccffcc"
| 45
| January 30
| Golden State
| 
| Sasha Pavlovic (24)
| Zydrunas Ilgauskas (10)
| Eric Snow (6)
| Quicken Loans Arena19,443
| 26–19

|- bgcolor="#ffcccc"
| 46
| February 1
| @ Miami
| 
| Daniel Gibson (19)
| Drew Gooden (9)
| LeBron James (9)
| AmericanAirlines Arena20,125
| 26–20
|- bgcolor="#ccffcc"
| 47
| February 2
| Charlotte
| 
| LeBron James (18)
| Anderson Varejão (13)
| Sasha Pavlovic (5)
| Quicken Loans Arena20,562
| 27–20
|- bgcolor="#ffcccc"
| 48
| February 4
| Detroit
| 
| LeBron James (21)
| Zydrunas Ilgauskas (11)
| LeBron James (6)
| Quicken Loans Arena20,140
| 27–21
|- bgcolor="#ccffcc"
| 49
| February 7
| L. A. Clippers
| 
| Zydrunas Ilgauskas, Sasha Pavlovic (16)
| Zydrunas Ilgauskas (16)
| Zydrunas Ilgauskas, Larry Hughes (4)
| Quicken Loans Arena20,129
| 28–21
|- bgcolor="#ccffcc"
| 50
| February 9
| Miami
| 
| LeBron James (29)
| Drew Gooden (13)
| Eric Snow (7)
| Quicken Loans Arena20,562
| 29–21
|- bgcolor="#ccffcc"
| 51
| February 11
| L. A. Lakers
| 
| Sasha Pavlovic (21)
| Drew Gooden (9)
| Eric Snow (6)
| Quicken Loans Arena20,562
| 30–21
|- bgcolor="#ffcccc"
| 52
| February 14
| @ Utah
| 
| Larry Hughes (33)
| Anderson Varejão (17)
| Daniel Gibson (5)
| EnergySolutions Arena19,911
| 30–22
|- bgcolor="#ccffcc"
| 53
| February 15
| @ L. A. Lakers
| 
| LeBron James (38)
| Anderson Varejão (11)
| Eric Snow (5)
| STAPLES Center18,997
| 31–22
|- bgcolor="#ccffcc"
| 54
| February 21
| @ Toronto
| 
| LeBron James (29)
| Anderson Varejão (15)
| Larry Hughes (5)
| Air Canada Centre19,800
| 32–22
|- bgcolor="#ffcccc"
| 55
| February 22
| Chicago
| 
| LeBron James (29)
| Larry Hughes, Anderson Varejão (8)
| Eric Snow (5)
| Quicken Loans Arena20,562
| 32–23
|- bgcolor="#ffcccc"
| 56
| February 25
| @ Miami
| 
| LeBron James (29)
| Anderson Varejão (12)
| LeBron James (7)
| AmericanAirlines Arena20,255
| 32–24
|- bgcolor="#ccffcc"
| 57
| February 27
| New Orleans/Oklahoma City
| 
| LeBron James (35)
| Zydrunas Ilgauskas (9)
| LeBron James (8)
| Quicken Loans Arena19,619
| 33–24

|- bgcolor="#ffcccc"
| 58
| March 1
| @ Dallas
| 
| LeBron James (39)
| Anderson Varejão (12)
| LeBron James (5)
| American Airlines Center20,428
| 33–25
|- bgcolor="#ccffcc"
| 59
| March 3
| Toronto
| 
| LeBron James (36)
| Anderson Varejão (11)
| LeBron James (6)
| Quicken Loans Arena20,562
| 34–25
|- bgcolor="#ccffcc"
| 60
| March 5
| Houston
| 
| LeBron James (32)
| LeBron James (12)
| LeBron James (8)
| Quicken Loans Arena20,562
| 35–25
|- bgcolor="#ccffcc"
| 61
| March 7
| @ Detroit
| 
| LeBron James (41)
| Drew Gooden, Zydrunas Ilgauskas (10)
| LeBron James (8)
| The Palace of Auburn Hills22,076
| 36–25
|- bgcolor="#ccffcc"
| 62
| March 10
| @ Milwaukee
| 
| LeBron James (32)
| Anderson Varejão (10)
| LeBron James (9)
| Bradley Center18,081
| 37–25
|- bgcolor="#ccffcc"
| 63
| March 11
| Indiana
| 
| LeBron James (26)
| Drew Gooden (8)
| Larry Hughes (7)
| Quicken Loans Arena20,562
| 38–25
|- bgcolor="#ccffcc"
| 64
| March 13
| Sacramento
| 
| Larry Hughes, Sasha Pavlovic (25)
| Zydrunas Ilgauskas, Drew Gooden (10)
| Zydrunas Ilgauskas, Larry Hughes (7)
| Quicken Loans Arena20,562
| 39–25
|- bgcolor="#ccffcc"
| 65
| March 14
| @ Memphis
| 
| LeBron James (29)
| Drew Gooden (12)
| Larry Hughes (6)
| FedEx Forum14,561
| 40–25
|- bgcolor="#ccffcc"
| 66
| March 17
| Utah
| 
| LeBron James (24)
| LeBron James (17)
| LeBron James (9)
| Quicken Loans Arena20,562
| 41–25
|- bgcolor="#ffcccc"
| 67
| March 20
| @ Charlotte
| 
| LeBron James (37)
| Zydrunas Ilgauskas, Anderson Varejão (9)
| Eric Snow (7)
| Charlotte Bobcats Arena17,043
| 41–26
|- bgcolor="#ffcccc"
| 68
| March 21
| Dallas
| 
| LeBron James (31)
| Drew Gooden (8)
| Larry Hughes (7)
| Quicken Loans Arena20,562
| 41–27
|- bgcolor="#ccffcc"
| 69
| March 23
| New York
| 
| LeBron James (21)
| Anderson Varejão (7)
| LeBron James (10)
| Quicken Loans Arena20,562
| 42–27
|- bgcolor="#ffcccc"
| 70
| March 25
| Denver
| 
| LeBron James, Zydrunas Ilgauskas (18)
| Drew Gooden (10)
| LeBron James (8)
| Quicken Loans Arena20,562
| 42–28
|- bgcolor="#ccffcc"
| 71
| March 27
| @ Indiana
| 
| LeBron James (26)
| LeBron James, Eric Snow, Drew Gooden, Anderson Varejão (7)
| LeBron James (6)
| Conseco Fieldhouse14,024
| 43–28
|- bgcolor="#ffcccc"
| 72
| March 28
| @ New York
| 
| LeBron James (24)
| Drew Gooden (7)
| LeBron James (7)
| Madison Square Garden19,763
| 43–29
|- bgcolor="#ccffcc"
| 73
| March 31
| @ Chicago
| 
| LeBron James (24)
| Drew Gooden (7)
| LeBron James (7)
| United Center22,960
| 44–29

|- bgcolor="#ffcccc"
| 74
| April 1
| @ Boston
| 
| Larry Hughes (24)
| Anderson Varejão (8)
| Eric Snow (8)
| TD Garden17,204
| 44–30
|- bgcolor="#ccffcc"
| 75
| April 3
| @ Minnesota
| 
| LeBron James (31)
| Drew Gooden (13)
| Larry Hughes (10)
| Target Center16,118
| 45–30
|- bgcolor="#ffcccc"
| 76
| April 5
| Miami
| 
| LeBron James (35)
| Drew Gooden (14)
| LeBron James (5)
| Quicken Loans Arena20,562
| 45–31
|- bgcolor="#ccffcc"
| 77
| April 6
| @ Washington
| 
| LeBron James (25)
| Zydrunas Ilgauskas (8)
| LeBron James (5)
| Verizon Center20,173
| 46–31
|- bgcolor="#ffcccc"
| 78
| April 8
| @ Detroit
| 
| LeBron James (20)
| Drew Gooden (12)
| LeBron James (6)
| The Palace of Auburn Hills22,076
| 46–32
|- bgcolor="#ccffcc"
| 79
| April 12
| New Jersey
| 
| LeBron James (35)
| Zydrunas Ilgauskas, Drew Gooden (9)
| Larry Hughes (6)
| Quicken Loans Arena20,562
| 47–32
|- bgcolor="#ccffcc"
| 80
| April 14
| Atlanta
| 
| LeBron James (23)
| Zydrunas Ilgauskas (11)
| LeBron James, Sasha Pavlovic (6)
| Quicken Loans Arena20,562
| 48–32
|- bgcolor="#ccffcc"
| 81
| April 17
| @ Philadelphia
| 
| Larry Hughes (22)
| Zydrunas Ilgauskas, Drew Gooden, Anderson Varejão (8)
| Eric Snow (8)
| Wachovia Center17,693
| 49–32
|- bgcolor="#ccffcc"
| 82
| April 18
| Milwaukee
| 
| LeBron James (24)
| Anderson Varejão (12)
| LeBron James (9)
| Quicken Loans Arena20,562
| 50–32

Playoffs

Game log

|- align="center" bgcolor="#ccffcc"
| 1
| April 22
| Washington
| W 97–82
| Larry Hughes (27)
| Anderson Varejão (10)
| LeBron James (7)
| Quicken Loans Arena20,562
| 1–0
|- align="center" bgcolor="#ccffcc"
| 2
| April 25
| Washington
| W 109–102
| LeBron James (27)
| Drew Gooden (14)
| LeBron James (7)
| Quicken Loans Arena20,562
| 2–0
|- align="center" bgcolor="#ccffcc"
| 3
| April 28
| @ Washington
| W 98–92
| LeBron James (30)
| Drew Gooden (12)
| LeBron James (9)
| Verizon Center20,173
| 3–0
|- align="center" bgcolor="#ccffcc"
| 4
| April 30
| @ Washington
| W 97–90
| LeBron James (31)
| Zydrunas Ilgauskas (19)
| LeBron James (7)
| Verizon Center20,173
| 4–0
|-

|- align="center" bgcolor="#ccffcc"
| 1
| May 6
| New Jersey
| W 81–77
| LeBron James (21)
| Gooden, Ilgauskas (14)
| LeBron James (7)
| Quicken Loans Arena20,562
| 1–0
|- align="center" bgcolor="#ccffcc"
| 2
| May 8
| New Jersey
| W 102–92
| LeBron James (36)
| Drew Gooden (14)
| LeBron James (12)
| Quicken Loans Arena20,562
| 2–0
|- align="center" bgcolor="#ffcccc"
| 3
| May 12
| @ New Jersey
| L 85–96
| Larry Hughes (23)
| Zydrunas Ilgauskas (8)
| LeBron James (12)
| Continental Airlines Arena20,032
| 2–1
|- align="center" bgcolor="#ccffcc"
| 4
| May 14
| @ New Jersey
| W 87–85
| LeBron James (30)
| Zydrunas Ilgauskas (11)
| LeBron James (7)
| Continental Airlines Arena20,032
| 3–1
|- align="center" bgcolor="#ffcccc"
| 5
| May 16
| New Jersey
| L 72–83
| LeBron James (20)
| LeBron James (9)
| LeBron James (5)
| Quicken Loans Arena20,562
| 3–2
|- align="center" bgcolor="#ccffcc"
| 6
| May 18
| @ New Jersey
| W 88–72
| LeBron James (23)
| LeBron James (8)
| LeBron James (8)
| Continental Airlines Arena20,032
| 4–2
|-

|- align="center" bgcolor="#ffcccc"
| 1
| May 21
| @ Detroit
| L 76–79
| Zydrunas Ilgauskas (22)
| Zydrunas Ilgauskas (13)
| LeBron James (9)
| The Palace of Auburn Hills22,076
| 0–1
|- align="center" bgcolor="#ffcccc"
| 2
| May 24
| @ Detroit
| L 76–79
| LeBron James (19)
| Anderson Varejão (14)
| LeBron James (7)
| The Palace of Auburn Hills22,076
| 0–2
|- align="center" bgcolor="#ccffcc"
| 3
| May 27
| Detroit
| W 88–82
| LeBron James (32)
| LeBron James (9)
| LeBron James (9)
| Quicken Loans Arena20,562
| 1–2
|- align="center" bgcolor="#ccffcc"
| 4
| May 29
| Detroit
| W 91–87
| LeBron James (25)
| Drew Gooden (8)
| LeBron James (11)
| Quicken Loans Arena20,562
| 2–2
|- align="center" bgcolor="#ccffcc"
| 5
| May 31
| @ Detroit
| W 109–107 (2OT)
| LeBron James (48)
| Zydrunas Ilgauskas (16)
| LeBron James (7)
| The Palace of Auburn Hills22,076
| 3–2
|- align="center" bgcolor="#ccffcc"
| 6
| June 2
| Detroit
| W 98–82
| Daniel Gibson (31)
| LeBron James (14)
| LeBron James (8)
| Quicken Loans Arena20,562
| 4–2
|-

|- align="center" bgcolor="#ffcccc"
| 1
| June 7
| @ San Antonio
| L 76–85
| Daniel Gibson (16)
| LeBron James (7)
| James, Gibson (4)
| AT&T Center18,797
| 0–1
|- align="center" bgcolor="#ffcccc"
| 2
| June 10
| @ San Antonio
| L 92–103
| LeBron James (25)
| Anderson Varejão (10)
| LeBron James (6)
| AT&T Center18,797
| 0–2
|- align="center" bgcolor="#ffcccc"
| 3
| June 12
| San Antonio
| L 72–75
| LeBron James (25)
| Zydrunas Ilgauskas (18)
| LeBron James (7)
| Quicken Loans Arena20,562
| 0–3
|- align="center" bgcolor="#ffcccc"
| 4
| June 14
| San Antonio
| L 82–83
| LeBron James (24)
| Zydrunas Ilgauskas (13)
| LeBron James (10)
| Quicken Loans Arena20,562
| 0–4
|-

First round

A rematch of the previous year's first round series was spoiled when Wizards star Gilbert Arenas and Caron Butler were both forced out of the playoffs due to injuries received in the later parts of the regular season.  Without Arenas and Butler, the Wizards found themselves unable to stop LeBron James and the Cleveland Cavaliers from sweeping them out of the playoffs. It was Cleveland's first playoff sweep in franchise history.

Eastern Semifinals

The Cavaliers advanced to the Eastern Conference Finals for the first time since 1992, while the Nets have lost in the Conference Semifinals in three out of the last four years.

New Jersey Nets point guard Jason Kidd averaged a triple double the entire playoffs, scoring 14.6 points, grabbing 10.9 rebounds and dishing out 10.9 assists per game.

The Cavaliers also got revenge of sorts, by eliminating the Nets two years after the Nets eliminated them on the final day of the regular season.

Eastern Finals

In a rematch of last year's thrilling second-round series, the Pistons and the Cavaliers matched up in perhaps one of the closest contested series in NBA history, with the first five games being decided by 6 points or less. The spotlight of the series fell on Cleveland's LeBron James. Despite gaining some momentum in the opening games of the series against the experienced Pistons, key last-second decisions by James led to Cleveland losses in Games 1 and 2 in Detroit, by identical scores where Cleveland led for most of the two games. They faced a 0–2 deficit for the second straight year but would easily remember from the year before they could win three straight games to get back into the series.

With media circles on his back for his complacency in these games (James had a playoff career low 10 points in Game 1), LeBron came back to will the Cavs to close victories in Games 3 and 4 in Cleveland, evening the series at 2. The series shifted back to Detroit for a Game 5 that proved to be one of the most memorable postseason games in recent NBA history. In a match that went into double overtime, the Cavaliers stunned the Pistons on their home court, thanks to LeBron James' playoff career-high 48 point performance. James scored the Cavaliers' final 25 points of the game, including all 18 points in overtime making it two straight two-point wins at the Palace in Game 5.

This time around the heavily favored Cavaliers took advantage of their home court in 2007 and exploded in Game 6 to close out the Pistons once and for all, and to clinch the franchise's first trip to the NBA Finals. Rookie Daniel Gibson scored his career high 31 points including five three-pointers to lift the Cavs in the second half behind a roaring home crowd.

NBA Finals

Game 1 
LeBron James and the Cleveland Cavaliers entered the 2007 Finals as newcomers. Game 1 was the first NBA Finals appearance in franchise history, and the first for each of its players (other than reserve point guard Eric Snow). However, the San Antonio Spurs had been to the Finals in three of the past eight seasons, winning a championship each time. With solid performances by Tim Duncan, Tony Parker, and Manu Ginóbili, the Spurs won the series opener in convincing fashion, limiting LeBron James to 14 points on 4–16 shooting.

Game 2 
The Spurs took a stranglehold on momentum in Game 2. The Spurs big three overwhelmed the Cavs and the Spurs led by as many as 29 points in the third quarter. They absolutely dominated game during first 3 quarters and played show-time basketball. A furious 25–6 rally by Cleveland in the final quarter wasn't enough as the Spurs took a 2–0 lead in the series.

Game 3 
Rookie Daniel Gibson started Game 3 in place of the injured Larry Hughes but scored a series-low 2 points on 1–10 shooting. As a team the Cavs shot only .367 but out-rebounded the Spurs 48–41. Zydrunas Ilgauskas had a 2006–07 season high 18 rebounds. On the game's final play, LeBron James missed a potential game-tying 29 foot 3-pointer (which he contested as a foul on Bruce Bowen).

Game 3 was the lowest-scoring Finals game since 1955, with Tim Duncan of the Spurs having his lowest scoring game in his NBA Finals career, with 14 points.

Game 4 
San Antonio started out strong through the first three quarters, leading by as many as 11.  Cleveland would stage a rally near the end of the third quarter and the first five minutes of the fourth, scoring 14 consecutive points to take its first second-half lead of the series.  However, the Spurs would stage a 12–3 rally of their own to retake the lead and win the series in a 4–0 sweep.

Player statistics

Regular season

Playoffs

Awards and records

Awards
 LeBron James was named the Eastern Conference Player of the Week for games played from November 13 through November 19.
 LeBron James was named the Eastern Conference Player of the Week for games played from March 5 through March 11.
 LeBron James was named the Eastern Conference Player of the Month for the month of March, the fifth time he has won the award.
 After the season, LeBron James was named to the All-NBA second team as a forward.

Records
 On November 25, Zydrunas Ilgauskas tied a franchise record for offensive rebounds in a half (10) and in a game (12) in the Cavs' 108–95 victory over the Philadelphia 76ers.
 On December 6, Zydrunas Ilgauskas became the all-time offensive rebound leader in Cavs history in a 95–91 win over the Toronto Raptors.
 In Game 5 of the Eastern Conference Finals, LeBron James set or tied franchise playoff records for: points in a game (48), points in overtime (9), field goals made and attempted in a game (18, 33) and field goals made in overtime (4).
 In Game 6 of the Eastern Conference Finals, Daniel Gibson set or tied franchise playoff records for: points in a quarter (19), points in a half (25), rookie points in a game (31) and three-pointers in a half (5).
 With his 19th playoff win, coach Mike Brown set the franchise record for playoff victories.

Milestones
 On December 23, LeBron James became the youngest player in NBA history to score 7,000 career points (21 years, 359 days).
 In the 2006–07 season, the Cavaliers swept all four California teams for the first time in team history (Golden State, Sacramento, LA Lakers, LA Clippers)
 On March 14, LeBron James became the youngest player in NBA history to score 8,000 career points (22 years, 74 days).
 On April 6, LeBron James became the 2nd fastest player to record 8,000 points, 2,000 rebounds and 2,000 assists in a career. LeBron did it in 311 games while it took Oscar Robertson 269 games and Michael Jordan 339.
 On April 14, the Cavaliers played the 3,000th game in franchise history

All-Star
 LeBron James led all players in votes received and was voted in as a starter for the 2007 NBA All-Star Game. His 2,516,049 votes were the second most in NBA history. He became the first player in team history to lead the league in votes.
 LeBron James led the Eastern Conference All-Stars with 28 points, 6 rebounds and 6 assists in the 132–153 loss.
 Damon Jones participated in the Three Point Contest and finished in 5th place.
 LeBron James participated in the Skills Challenge and finished in 3rd place.

Transactions

Trades
The Cavaliers did not make a trade during the 2006–07 NBA season.

Free agents
The Cavaliers did not sign any free agents during the 2006–07 NBA season.

Development League
 On March 2, Shannon Brown was assigned to the NBDL's Albuquerque Thunderbirds.
 On March 3, Shannon Brown was recalled from the Thunderbirds.
 On March 23, Dwayne Jones was assigned to the Thunderbirds.
 On March 27, Dwayne Jones was recalled from the Thunderbirds.

References

 Cleveland Cavaliers on Database Basketball
 Cleveland Cavaliers on Basketball Reference
 2006–07 Season Media Guide

External links
 
 

Cleveland Cavaliers seasons
Eastern Conference (NBA) championship seasons
Cleve
Cleve